Solid Ground is the fifth studio album by Indonesian-based blues rock band Gugun Blues Shelter. The album also the second released under Grooveyard Records and band name Gugun Power Trio.
All recording material was recorded in their studio in Cibubur Jakarta, mixing and mastering process was taken by Don Moore in New York City.

Track listing
All song written and composed by Gugun Power Trio.

Personnel
 Gugun - Lead Guitar and Lead Vocals
 Jono Armstrong - Bass guitar
 Bowie - Drums

References

External links 
 Official Site

2011 albums
Gugun Blues Shelter albums